Nils Einar Vinjor (born 15 December 1962 in Øvre Årdal, Norway) is a Norwegian guitarist known for his solo albums and the collaboration with musicians like Silje Nergaard, Iver Kleive and Knut Reiersrud.

Career 
Vinjor, residing in Oslo, is known in Norway as a central guitarist and composer on the Norwegian musical scene. As a freelance musician Vinjor played together with a number of famous Norwegian performers, and also toured in several European countries and East-Asia. In 1997 he released the solo album Sjonglør with music in the generes jazz, rock and blues, and later the album Silent Traveler (2004).

Discography

Solo albums 
1997: Sjonglør (Skald AS)
2004: Silent Traveler (Virgin Records)

Collaborations 
With Silje Nergaard
1990: Tell me Where You're Going (Sonet Music)
1996: Hjemmefra (Kirkelig Kulturverksted)
2003: Nightwatch (EmArcy)
2005: Be Still my Heart - the Essential (EmArcy)
2007: Darkness Out Of Blue (EmArcy)
2012: Unclouded (Sony Music)

With Iver Kleive and Knut Reiersrud
1991: Blå Koral (Kirkelig Kulturverksted)

With Jonas Fjeld
1993: Texas Jensen (Stageway Records)

With Tove Nilsen
1995: Fly - Over (Self Releace)

With Havrøy & Johnsen
2004: Den Lange Taushet (Park Grammofon)

With Tirill_Mohn
2003: A Dance with the Shadows (The Wild Places)
2011: Tales from Tranquil August Gardens (FairyMusic)
2011: Nine And Fifty Swans (FairyMusic)
2013: Um Himinjǫður (FairyMusic)

References

External links

Norwegian jazz guitarists
Norwegian jazz composers
20th-century Norwegian guitarists
21st-century Norwegian guitarists
Musicians from Årdal
1962 births
Living people
Kirtan performers
20th-century guitarists